National Route 181 is a national highway of Japan connecting Tsuyama, Okayama and Yonago, Tottori in Japan, with a total length of 101.8 km (63.26 mi).

References

National highways in Japan
Roads in Okayama Prefecture
Roads in Tottori Prefecture